Manikgad /  (also called Gadchandur) is an ancient fort in Chandrapur district, Maharashtra. It is a hill fort 507 metres above sea level built by the Naga kings in 9 CE. The fort is in ruins and is frequented by wild animals that live in the vicinity, such as panthers and boars. Several monuments of historical importance are nearby.

History 
Manikgad was built by the last Mana Naga King - Gahilu. The Mana Nagas settled in this area around 9 CE. Initially, the fort was named Manikagad after the patron deity of the Mana Nagas - Manikadevi - but later on this was shortened to Manikgad.

Local legend holds that the fort was built by a Gond king named Mankyal (hence the name Manikgad). However, the lintel of the entrance gate has a Naga image carved in relief and not the Gond emblem of a lion and an elephant.

Features 
The fort was built of large black stones and was a formidable defense in its time. Rampart walls of the fort enclose a valley that has ruins of old buildings and store-houses. Outlines of apartments are visible against the rampart walls. The southern bastion, along with its supporting wall, collapsed.

In the valley below lies a cannon that likely was mounted on that bastion. Unlike a cast-iron cannon, this cannon is made of several iron straps welded together. The gateway of the fort is intact.

The Queen's palace is situated near a small dam with steps and a few rooms for bathing. Two wooden pagodas were constructed by the Forest Department. The fort area is filled with shrubs and trees.

Gallery

References 

Forts in Maharashtra
Forts in Vidarbha